Kinyara Power Station is a 40.8 MW bagasse-fired thermal power plant in Uganda, the third-largest economy in the East African Community.

Location
The power station is located in the town of Kinyara in Masindi District in the Western Region of Uganda, on the campus of Kinyara Sugar Limited, which owns the station. The coordinates of the station are:1°38'12.0"N, 31°36'24.0"E (Latitude:1.636667; Longitude:31.606667).

Overview
Kinyara Power Station is owned and operated by Kinyara Sugar Limited, the second-largest sugar manufacturer in Uganda. The power station was designed and built around the sugar manufacturing plant of Kinyara Sugar Ltd. The fibrous residue from the process of crushing sugar cane, known as bagasse, is burnt to heat water in boilers and produce steam. The steam is pressurized and used to drive turbines which then generate electricity. The excess heat is used in the sugar manufacturing process. , the power station was capable of producing a maximum of 14.5MW of electricity.
, the power station sold 4MW to the national grid. Plans are underway to expand power production to 40MW by 2015. Of this, 22MW was expected to be sold to the national grid and the rest used by the sugar manufacturing complex at Kinyara.

See also

List of sugar manufacturers in Uganda
List of power stations in Uganda

References

External links
Kinyara Power Station Lights Up Neighboring Communities
 Kinyara farmers get mediator for pay rise row

Sarrai Group
Bagasse-fired power stations in Uganda
Masindi District
Western Region, Uganda